Levati is an Italian surname. Notable people with the surname include:

Ambrogio Levati (1894–1963), Italian gymnast
Giuseppe Levati (1739–1828), Italian painter

Italian-language surnames